Jeremy Porter Linn (born January 6, 1975) is an American former competition swimmer, Olympic medalist, and former world record-holder.  Linn set an American record in the 100-meter breaststroke while winning the silver medal in that event at the 1996 Summer Olympics. He has recently been selected to be inducted in the Tennessee Athletics Hall of Fame with the class of 2017.

At the 1996 Olympics in Atlanta, Georgia, Mark Henderson, Gary Hall Jr., Jeff Rouse and Linn set a new world record in the men's 400-metre medley relay.  Linn was known for his unusual warm-up routine and unorthodox swim sets.  A typical warm-up set consisted of flips off the blocks. Linn was given the nickname "The Goat" due to his facial hair.

Linn attended the University of Tennessee from 1995 to 1998, where he was a member of the Tennessee Volunteers swimming and diving team in National Collegiate Athletic Association (NCAA) and Southeastern Conference (SEC) competition.  He was a seventeen-time All-American.  Linn won eleven SEC swimming titles-six individual and five relay.  He also helped the Tennessee Volunteers win an SEC team championship in 1996. At the national level, he won four individual NCAA titles. Linn held the NCAA and U.S. Open record in the 100 yard breaststroke until 2007, that record was broken by Mike Alexandrov of Northwestern University.

Linn was the senior coach at the QDD Swim Team in Manassas, Virginia from September 2004 until August 2007.  Linn coached three swimmers to national championship qualifying times and he also coached three of the four QDD women in the 200-meter freestyle relay to the VSI State Senior Championships for short course in 2007, breaking the meet record and nearly breaking the five-year-old state record.  Linn coached 11 QDD athletes whom achieved USA Swimming's Scholastic All-American status for the 2006–07 school year, Linn coached for Tar Heel Aquatic Team, in Durham-Chapel Hill, North Carolina from August 2007 to December 2007.  He now coaches for Nations Capital swim team in northern Virginia.

See also
 List of Olympic medalists in swimming (men)
 List of University of Tennessee people
 World record progression 4 × 100 metres medley relay

References

External links
 
 QDD
 Nation's Capital Swim Club 
 VA Swimming

1975 births
Living people
American male breaststroke swimmers
American swimming coaches
World record setters in swimming
Olympic gold medalists for the United States in swimming
Olympic silver medalists for the United States in swimming
Sportspeople from Harrisburg, Pennsylvania
People from Manassas, Virginia
Swimmers at the 1996 Summer Olympics
Tennessee Volunteers men's swimmers
Medalists at the 1996 Summer Olympics
20th-century American people
21st-century American people